Degrassi Classic novels are a series of mass market paperback novelizations of the Canadian teen drama series Degrassi Junior High and Degrassi High. Released by James Lorimer & Co. from 1988 to 1992, the novels sometimes adapted plots from the series, but also elaborated on plots not addressed completely on the series. The books would often center on a particular character on the show, although the novel Exit Stage Left is based on the overall series. A thirteenth book, based on the characters Arthur and Yick and written by Kathryn Ellis, remains unreleased. Lorimer reprinted several of the books at the height of Degrassi: The Next Generation's popularity in 2006.

The books were also published in other places; in Australia, they were published by ABC in November 1990. The books also saw French Canadian releases by Les Éditions de Minuit.

List of books

Reception 
The 2006 re-releases of Spike, Caitlin, Joey Jeremiah, and Snake received a favourable review from author Kristin Butcher, particularly singling out Snake and Spike.

External links 

 https://degrassi.ca/books/

References 

Books based on Degrassi
Degrassi Junior High